Ust-Srednekan Hydroelectric Plant is a hydroelectric power station located on the Kolyma River near the village of Ust-Srednekan, Srednekansky District, Magadan Oblast Russia. It has an installed power generation capacity of 570 MW.

History
Following the completion of the Kolyma Hydroelectric Station in 1978, the site of the future Ust-Srednekan Hydroelectric Plant was inspected by Lenhydroproject engineers. A feasibility study was approved in 1989 by the USSR Ministry of Energy and Electrification. Preliminary construction work at the site of the hydroelectric complex began in 1990 and initially made rapid progress.
The first phase included the construction of a road to Ust-Srednekan as well as the layout of a foundation. In 1992 the lintels of the foundation pit of the main structures were filled, and a temporary concrete plant was put into operation. In 1993 the first cubic meter of concrete at the construction of the hydroelectric power station was laid and a bridge across the Kolyma was built in order to provide a  connection with the construction site on the opposite bank. In 1996 the first tower crane as well as the second stage of a temporary concrete plant and a 110/35/6 Kw substation were put into operation. In 1999 began the installation of hydraulic power equipment. All along the 1990s decade construction was hampered owing to insufficient funding.

See also
Kolyma Reservoir

References

External links

Dams in Russia
Hydroelectric power stations in Russia
Rock-filled dams
Buildings and structures in Magadan Oblast
Underground power stations
1991 establishments in the Soviet Union
Hydroelectric power stations built in the Soviet Union
Kolyma basin